Euphaedra phaethusa, the Common ceres forester, is a butterfly in the Nymphalidae family. It is found in Guinea, Sierra Leone, Liberia, Ivory Coast, Ghana, Togo, Benin and possibly Nigeria. The habitat consists of forests.

The larvae feed on Blighia sapida.

Subspecies
Euphaedra phaethusa phaethusa (Ivory Coast, Ghana, Togo, Benin, Nigeria). There is also a form ceroides.
Euphaedra phaethusa aurea Hecq, 1983 (Guinea, Sierra Leone, western Liberia)

Similar species
Other members of the Euphaedra ceres species group q.v.

References

Insects described in 1866
phaethusa